Amer Jugo (born 5 December 1982) is a Bosnian-Herzegovinian retired footballer. He played for FK Velež Mostar in Bosnian-Herzegovinian Premier League.

International career
He made his debut for Bosnia and Herzegovina in a January 2008 friendly match away against Japan and has earned a total of 2 caps, scoring no goals. His second and final international was a June 2009 friendly against Uzbekistan.

References

External links
 

1982 births
Living people
People from Trebinje
Association football midfielders
Bosnia and Herzegovina footballers
Bosnia and Herzegovina international footballers
FK Velež Mostar players
FK Laktaši players
FK Mughan players
FK Olimpik players
OFK Gradina players
Premier League of Bosnia and Herzegovina players
First League of the Federation of Bosnia and Herzegovina players
Azerbaijan Premier League players
Bosnia and Herzegovina expatriate footballers
Expatriate footballers in Azerbaijan
Bosnia and Herzegovina expatriate sportspeople in Azerbaijan